is a railway station on the Sasshō Line in Tōbetsu, Hokkaidō, Japan, operated by the Hokkaido Railway Company (JR Hokkaido). The station is numbered G14 and serves the Tōbetsu Campus of the Health Sciences University of Hokkaido (HSUH). Since the closure of the railway between Shin-Totsukawa and this station on May 7, 2020, it has been the northern terminus of the line.

Lines

Station layout
The station has two staggered side platforms serving two tracks. Both platforms can serve 6-car electrified trains. Platform 1 is the only track connected to the non-electrified single-track former section of the line towards Shin-Totsukawa; Platform 2 is a bay platform opened on 1 December 1995, serving the electrified line towards Sapporo. After the closure of the non-electrified section, both platforms serve trains towards Sapporo. The station has automated ticket machines and Kitaca card readers (not equipped with regular ticket gates). An overpass directly connects the HSUH to the station. The station is unattended and managed from Tōbetsu.

Platforms

History
The station opened on 1 April 1982, initially named .

Electric services commenced from 1 June 2012, following electrification of the line between Sapporo and this station.

In December 2018, it was announced that the station would become the terminus station of the Sasshō Line as a result of the closure of the non-electrified section of the line in May 2020. Services ceased from 18 April 2020 due to the COVID-19 crisis; the line was officially closed on 7 May 2020 as planned.

Surrounding area
 Health Sciences University of Hokkaido, after which the station is named
 National Route 275

References

External links

 Official website 

Railway stations in Hokkaido Prefecture
Railway stations in Japan opened in 1982
Stations of Hokkaido Railway Company